Sanford Marak is an Indian politician. He was elected to the Lok Sabha, the lower house of the Parliament of India from the Tura constituency of Meghalaya as a member of the Indian National Congress.

References

External links
Official biographical sketch in Parliament of India website

1934 births
Living people
People from Tura, Meghalaya
Indian National Congress politicians from Meghalaya
Lok Sabha members from Meghalaya
India MPs 1989–1991
Garo people